Established in 1867, the Nebraska State College System is the governing body for Nebraska's three public colleges (Chadron State College, Peru State College, and Wayne State College) that are not part of the University of Nebraska System.  

Chadron State College, Peru State College, and Wayne State College, along with the System Office and the Board of Trustees constitute the Nebraska State College System.

Colleges

Chadron State College

Located in Chadron, it is the only four-year and graduate-degree granting college in western Nebraska.

Peru State College

Located in Peru, Nemaha County.  It was founded in 1865, making it the first and oldest college in Nebraska.

Wayne State College

Located in Wayne, it has the highest enrollment of the system, with 4,202 students in 2022.

Board of Trustees
John Chaney - Chair
Bob Engles - Vice Chair
Carter "Cap" Peterson 
Marjean Terrell
Jess Zeiss
Deborah Frison
Sullivan Jones, Chadron State Student Trustee
Cooper Reichman, Chadron State Student Trustee
Matthew Leininger, Peru State Student Trustee
Olivia McAsey, Peru State Student Trustee
Brett Hilbers, Wayne State Student Trustee
Emma Wilkinson, Wayne State Student Trustee

See also
 University of Nebraska system
 Education in Nebraska

References

External links
 

 
Nebraska
State College System